Avenue on Brickell is a residential high-rise complex in the Brickell district of Miami, Florida, United States. The project consists of two high-rise residential towers, Avenue on Brickell East Tower and Avenue on Brickell West Tower. Both towers were topped off in early 2007, and were structurally completed in late 2007. Both buildings were designed by SB Architects.

See also
 List of tallest buildings in Miami

References

External links
 Avenue on Brickell on Emporis
 Avenue on Brickell Towers on SkyscraperPage

Residential buildings completed in 2007
Residential skyscrapers in Miami
Twin towers
2007 establishments in Florida